Codiaeum variegatum (fire croton, garden croton, or variegated croton; syn. Croton variegatum L.) is a species of plant in the genus Codiaeum, which is a member of the family Euphorbiaceae. It was described by Carl Linnaeus in 1753. It is native to Indonesia, Malaysia, Australia, and the western Pacific Ocean islands, growing in open forests and scrub. 

The garden crotons should not be confused with Croton, a cosmopolitan genus also in the Euphorbiaceae, containing more than 700 species of herbs, shrubs and trees.

Description
The leaf blades can, for example, be ruler-lanceolate, oblong, elliptic, lanceolate, ovate inverted, ovate spatulate, or violin-shaped and coloured green, yellow, or purple in various patterns, depending on the variety. The petiole has a length of 0.2 to 2.5 cm. The female flowers are yellowish, with no petals. The flowering period is usually in early autumn. When cut, stems bleed a milky sap like many of the Euphorbiaceae.

Cultivation

In tropical climates, crotons make attractive hedges and potted patio specimens, valued for their striking foliage. They only survive outdoors where temperatures do not normally drop below  in winter; colder temperatures can cause leaf loss. In colder climates, the plants are grown in greenhouses or as house plants. They are sometimes grouped under the name Codiaeum variegatum var. pictum (Lodd.) Müll. Arg., though this is not botanically distinct from the species and usually treated as a synonym of it.

Cultivars
The several hundred cultivars are selected and bred for their foliage. Depending on the cultivar, the leaves may be ovate to linear, entire to deeply lobed or crinkled, and variegated with green, white, purple, orange, yellow, red, or pink. The colour patterns may follow the veins or the margins, or be in blotches on the leaf.

Toxicity
As with many of the Euphorbiaceae, the sap can cause contact dermatitis in some people. The bark, roots, latex, and leaves are poisonous. The toxin is the chemical compound 5-desoxyingenol.  The plant contains an oil which is violently purgative and is suspected of being a carcinogen.  Consumption of the seeds can be fatal to children.

Gallery

References

Codiaeae
House plants
Plants described in 1753
Taxa named by Carl Linnaeus
Garden plants
Poisonous plants